The Nișcov is a right tributary of the river Buzău in Romania. It discharges into the Buzău in Vernești.

References

Rivers of Romania
Rivers of Buzău County